The splittails are a genus Pogonichthys of cyprinid fish, consisting of two species native to western North America.

The common name is inspired by the distinctive appearance of the tail fin, in which the upper lobe is distinctly larger.

Of the two species, only the Sacramento splittail survives; the Clear Lake splittail became extinct in the mid-1970s.

Species 
 †Pogonichthys ciscoides Hopkirk, 1974 (Clear Lake splittail)
 Pogonichthys macrolepidotus (Ayres, 1854) (Sacramento splittail)

References
 

 
Fish of North America
Fish of the United States
Taxa named by Spencer Fullerton Baird
Fish genera with one living species